The Province of Buffalo was a proposal for the creation of a new Canadian province in the early 20th century. Its main proponent was Sir Frederick Haultain, the premier of the North-West Territories.

However, Haultain's frosty relations with Canadian Prime Minister Sir Wilfrid Laurier did not help his cause, and in 1905, his proposed province was divided into Alberta in the west and Saskatchewan in the east.

History

The Province of Buffalo was one of several proposals for the area of what would become Alberta and Saskatchewan. Haultain proposed the idea in 1904, stating that "One big province would be able to do things no other province could." At the time the majority of Calgarians and Edmontonians disagreed with the proposal, since Haultain thought the capital of the new province should be Regina, but the two major western cities each had their own ambitions to be a capital city (Edmonton eventually becoming the capital of Alberta). Laurier eventually decided to carve two provinces out of that section of the North-West Territories by dividing the land up with a north–south line. This created Alberta in the west, and Saskatchewan in the east.

In 2005 Canadian Geographic magazine ran a cover story, "How the West was divided", on Haultain's proposal.

References

External links
The Buffalo Province History Conference
January/February 2005 Issue of Canadian Geographic, with the article "How the West was divided "

Buffalo
History of Alberta by location
History of Saskatchewan by location